Boettger's lizard (Gallotia caesaris) is a species of wall lizard in the family Lacertidae. The species is endemic to the Canary Islands. There are two recognized subspecies.

Etymology
The specific name, caesaris, is in honor of German malacologist Caesar Rudolf Boettger, who was a nephew of German herpetologist Oskar Boettger.

Geographic range
G. caesaris is native to two of the western Canary Islands, El Hierro and La Gomera. On the neighboring islands Tenerife and La Palma it is replaced by its close relative Gallotia galloti. G. caesaris has been introduced by humans on the Portuguese island of Madeira.

Habitat

Reproduction
G. caesaris is oviparous. A sexually mature female may lay three clutches per year, and each clutch may contain 1–5 eggs.

Subspecies
Two subspecies are recognized as being valid, including the nominotypical subspecies:
Gallotia caesaris caesaris  – El Hierro
Gallotia caesaris gomerae  – La Gomera

Nota bene: A trinomial authority in parentheses indicates that the subspecies was originally described in a genus other than Gallotia.

References

Further reading
Bannert B (1998). "Zum Fortpflanzungsbiologie der Halsbandeidechsen von Madeira und den Kanarischen Inseln in Gefangenschaft ". Salamandra 34 (4): 289–300. (Gallotia caesaris, restored to species status). (in German, with an abstract in English).
Boettger CR, Müller L (1914). "Preliminary Notes on the Local Races of some Canarian Lizards". Annals and Magazine of Natural History, Eighth Series 14: 67–78. ("Lacerta galloti cæsaris ", new status, p. 74).
Lehrs P (1914). "Description of a new lizard from the Canary Islands". Proceedings of the Zoological Society of London 1914: 681–684. ("Lacerta cæsaris ", new species).
Sindaco R, Jeremčenko VK (2008). The Reptiles of the Western Palearctic. 1. Annotated Checklist and Distributional Atlas of the Turtles, Crocodiles, Amphisbaenians and Lizards of Europe, North Africa, Middle East and Central Asia. (Monographs of the Societas Herpetologica Italica). Latina, Italy: Edizioni Belvedere. 580 pp. .

External links
de.Wikipedia contributors (2006): Kleine Kanareneidechse. Wikipedia, Die freie Enzyklopädie. Version of 12:35, 17. Feb. 2006. Retrieved 18:53, May 18, 2006.
Maca-Meyer N, Carranza S, Rando JC, Arnold EN, Cabrera VM (2003). "Status and relationships of the extinct giant Canary Island lizard Gallotia goliath (Reptilia: Lacertidae), assessed using ancient mtDNA from its mummified remains". Biological Journal of the Linnean Society 80 (4): 659–670.  (HTML abstract).
 Database entry includes a range map and a brief justification of why this species is of least concern.

lacerta.de: Gallotia caesaris caesaris image gallery. Retrieved 2007-FEB-25.
lacerta.de: Gallotia caesaris gomerae image gallery. Retrieved 2007-FEB-25.

Gallotia
Reptiles of the Canary Islands
Reptiles described in 1914
Taxa named by Philipp Lehrs